was a Japanese samurai and commander of the Sengoku period. Motozumi was one of the most important retainers of the Mōri clan. He was also the castle lord in command of Sakurao Castle.

Saka Hirohide, who was related to Motosumi's father Katsura Hirozumi, rebelled against Mōri Motonari.  Hirohide was dissatisfied with Motonari's succession to the family headship, but the rebellion ended in failure . Later, Hirozumi took responsibility for the conflict and committed seppuku.
In the Battle of Miyajima, Motozumi succeeded as a decoy and lured Sue Harukata's army toward Itsukushima and so contributed to the victory of the Mōri clan.

References

Samurai
1500 births
1569 deaths
Mōri clan